Tachypeza is a genus of flies belonging to the family Hybotidae.

The species of this genus are found in Europe and Northern America.

Species:
 Tachypeza annularis Melander, 1927 
 Tachypeza binotata Melander, 1927

References

Hybotidae